Amelia Mary Earhart (born July 24, 1897; disappeared July 2, 1937; declared dead January 5, 1939) was an American aviation pioneer and writer. Earhart was the first female aviator to fly solo across the Atlantic Ocean. She set many other records, was one of the first aviators to promote commercial air travel, wrote best-selling books about her flying experiences, and was instrumental in the formation of The Ninety-Nines, an organization for female pilots.

Born and raised in Atchison, Kansas, and later in Des Moines, Iowa, Earhart developed a passion for adventure at a young age, steadily gaining flying experience from her twenties. In 1928, Earhart became the first female passenger to cross the Atlantic by airplane (accompanying pilot Wilmer Stultz), for which she achieved celebrity status. In 1932, piloting a Lockheed Vega 5B, Earhart made a nonstop solo transatlantic flight, becoming the first woman to achieve such a feat. She received the United States Distinguished Flying Cross for this accomplishment. In 1935, Earhart became a visiting faculty member at Purdue University as an advisor to aeronautical engineering and a career counselor to female students. She was also a member of the National Woman's Party and an early supporter of the Equal Rights Amendment. Known as one of the most inspirational American figures in aviation from the late 1920s throughout the 1930s, Earhart's legacy is often compared to the early aeronautical career of pioneer aviator Charles Lindbergh, as well as to figures like First Lady Eleanor Roosevelt for their close friendship and lasting impact on the issue of women's causes from that period.

During an attempt at becoming the first woman to complete a circumnavigational flight of the globe in 1937 in a Purdue-funded Lockheed Model 10-E Electra, Earhart and navigator Fred Noonan disappeared over the central Pacific Ocean near Howland Island. The two were last seen in Lae, New Guinea, on July 2, 1937, on the last land stop before Howland Island and one of their final legs of the flight. She presumably died in the Pacific during the circumnavigation, just three weeks prior to her fortieth birthday. Nearly one year and six months after she and Noonan disappeared, Earhart was officially declared dead. Investigations and significant public interest in their disappearance still continue over 80 years later.

Decades after her presumed death, Earhart was inducted into the National Aviation Hall of Fame in 1968 and the National Women's Hall of Fame in 1973. She now has several commemorative memorials named in her honor around the United States, including an urban park, an airport, a residence hall, a museum, a research foundation, a bridge, a cargo ship, an earth-fill dam, four schools, a hotel, a playhouse, a library, multiple roads, and more. She also has a minor planet, planetary corona, and newly-discovered lunar crater named after her. She is ranked ninth on Flying's list of the 51 Heroes of Aviation.

Early life

Childhood 

Earhart was born on July 24, 1897 in Atchison, Kansas, the daughter of Samuel "Edwin" Stanton Earhart (1867–1930) and Amelia "Amy" (1869–1962). She was born in the home of her maternal grandfather, Alfred Gideon Otis (1827–1912), who was a former federal judge, the president of the Atchison Savings Bank and a leading citizen in the town. Earhart was the second child of the marriage after an infant was stillborn in August 1896. She was of part German descent. Alfred Otis had not initially favored the marriage and was not satisfied with Edwin's progress as a lawyer.

According to family custom, Earhart was named after her two grandmothers, Amelia Josephine Harres and Mary Wells Patton. From an early age, Earhart was the ringleader while her sister Grace Muriel Earhart (1899–1998), two years her junior, acted as the dutiful follower. Amelia was nicknamed "Meeley" (sometimes "Millie") and Grace was nicknamed "Pidge"; both girls continued to answer to their childhood nicknames well into adulthood. Their upbringing was unconventional, as Amy Earhart did not believe in raising her children to be "nice little girls". But their maternal grandmother disapproved of the "bloomers" they wore, and although Earhart liked the freedom of movement they provided, she was sensitive to the fact that the neighborhood's girls wore dresses.

Early influence 

A spirit of adventure seemed to abide in the Earhart children, with the pair setting off daily to explore their neighborhood. As a child, Earhart spent long hours playing with sister Pidge, climbing trees, hunting rats with a rifle, and "belly-slamming" her sled downhill. Although the love of the outdoors and "rough-and-tumble" play was common to many youngsters, some biographers have characterized the young Earhart as a tomboy. The girls kept "worms, moths, katydids and a tree toad" in a growing collection gathered in their outings. In 1904, with the help of her uncle, Earhart cobbled together a home-made ramp, fashioned after a roller coaster she had seen on a trip to St. Louis, and secured the ramp to the roof of the family toolshed. Earhart's well-documented first flight ended dramatically. She emerged from the broken wooden box that had served as a sled with a bruised lip, torn dress and a "sensation of exhilaration". She exclaimed, "Oh, Pidge, it's just like flying!"

Although there had been some missteps in Edwin Earhart's career up to that point, in 1907 his job as a claims officer for the Rock Island Railroad led to a transfer to Des Moines, Iowa. The next year, at the age of 10, Earhart saw her first aircraft at the Iowa State Fair in Des Moines. Her father tried to interest his daughters in taking a flight. One look at the rickety "flivver" was enough for Earhart, who promptly asked if they could go back to the merry-go-round. She later described the biplane as "a thing of rusty wire and wood and not at all interesting".

Education 

Sisters Amelia and Muriel (who went by her middle name from her teens on) remained with their grandparents in Atchison while their parents moved into new, smaller quarters in Des Moines. During this period, the Earhart girls received home-schooling from their mother and governess. Amelia later recounted that she was "exceedingly fond of reading" and spent countless hours in the large family library. In 1909, when the family was finally reunited in Des Moines, the Earhart children were enrolled in public school for the first time and Amelia, 12, entered seventh grade.

Family fortunes 

While the family's finances seemingly improved with the acquisition of a new house and even the hiring of two servants, it soon became apparent that Edwin was an alcoholic. Five years later in 1914, he was forced to retire and although he attempted to rehabilitate himself through treatment, he was never reinstated at the Rock Island Railroad. At about this time, Earhart's grandmother Amelia Otis died suddenly, leaving a substantial estate that placed her daughter's share in a trust, fearing that Edwin's drinking would drain the funds. The Otis house was auctioned along with all of its contents; Earhart was heartbroken and later described it as the end of her childhood.

In 1915, after a long search, Earhart's father found work as a clerk at the Great Northern Railway in St. Paul, Minnesota, where Earhart entered Central High School as a junior. Edwin applied for a transfer to Springfield, Missouri, in 1915, but the current claims officer reconsidered his retirement and demanded his job back, leaving the elder Earhart with nowhere to go. Facing another calamitous move, Amy Earhart took her children to Chicago, where they lived with friends. Earhart made an unusual condition in the choice of her next schooling; she canvassed nearby high schools in Chicago to find the best science program. She rejected the high school nearest her home when she complained that the chemistry lab was "just like a kitchen sink". She eventually enrolled in Hyde Park High School but spent a miserable semester where a yearbook caption captured the essence of her unhappiness, "A.E. – the girl in brown who walks alone".

Earhart graduated from Chicago's Hyde Park High School in 1916. Throughout her troubled childhood, she had continued to aspire to a future career; she kept a scrapbook of newspaper clippings about successful women in predominantly male-oriented fields, including film direction and production, law, advertising, management, and mechanical engineering. She began junior college at Ogontz School in Rydal, Pennsylvania, but did not complete her program.

During Christmas vacation in 1917, Earhart visited her sister in Toronto. World War I had been raging and Earhart saw the returning wounded soldiers. After receiving training as a nurse's aide from the Red Cross, she began work with the Voluntary Aid Detachment at Spadina Military Hospital. Her duties included preparing food in the kitchen for patients with special diets and handing out prescribed medication in the hospital's dispensary. There, Earhart heard stories from military pilots and developed an interest in flying.

Spanish flu pandemic of 1918 
When the 1918 Spanish flu pandemic reached Toronto, Earhart was engaged in arduous nursing duties that included night shifts at the Spadina Military Hospital. She became a patient herself, experiencing pneumonia and maxillary sinusitis. She was hospitalized for pneumonia in early November 1918 and discharged in December 1918, about two months after the illness had started. Her sinus-related symptoms were pain and pressure around one eye and copious mucus drainage via the nostrils and throat. While staying in the hospital during the pre-antibiotic era, she had painful minor operations to wash out the affected maxillary sinus, but these procedures were not successful and Earhart continued to have worsening headaches. Her convalescence lasted nearly a year, which she spent at her sister's home in Northampton, Massachusetts. Earhart passed the time reading poetry, learning to play the banjo, and studying mechanics. Chronic sinusitis significantly affected Earhart's flying and activities in later life, and sometimes even on the airfield she was forced to wear a bandage on her cheek to cover a small drainage tube.

Early flying experiences 

At about that time, Earhart and a young woman friend visited an air fair held in conjunction with the Canadian National Exhibition in Toronto. "The interest, aroused in me, in Toronto, led me to all the air circuses in the vicinity" One of the highlights of the day was a flying exhibition put on by a World War I ace. The pilot overhead spotted Earhart and her friend, who were watching from an isolated clearing, and dived at them. "I am sure he said to himself, 'Watch me make them scamper,'" she said. Earhart stood her ground as the aircraft came close. "I did not understand it at the time," she said, "but I believe that little red airplane said something to me as it swished by."

By 1919, Earhart prepared to enter Smith College, where her sister was a student. However, she changed her mind and enrolled in a course in medical studies and other programs at Columbia University. Earhart quit a year later to be with her parents, who had reunited in California.

On December 28, 1920, Earhart and her father attended an "aerial meet" at Daugherty Field in Long Beach, California. She asked her father, Edwin, to ask about passenger flights and flying lessons. She was booked for a passenger flight the following day at Emory Roger's Field, at the corner of Wilshire Boulevard and Fairfax Avenue. The cost was $10 for a 10 minute flight with Frank Hawks (who later gained fame as an air racer). Hawks gave her a ride that would forever change Earhart's life. "By the time I had got two or three hundred feet [60–90 m] off the ground," she said, "I knew I had to fly."

The next month Earhart recruited Neta Snook to be her flying instructor. The initial contract was for 12 hours of instruction, for $500. Working at a variety of jobs including photographer, truck driver, and stenographer at the local telephone company, she managed to save $1,000 for flying lessons. Earhart had her first lesson on January 3, 1921, at Kinner Field on the west side of Long Beach Boulevard and Tweedy Road, now in the city of South Gate. Snook used a crash-salvaged Curtiss JN-4 "Canuck", that Snook had restored, for training. In order to reach the airfield, Earhart had to take a bus to the end of the line, then walk four miles (6 km). Earhart's mother also provided part of the $1,000 "stake" against her "better judgement".

Earhart's commitment to flying required her to accept the frequent hard work and rudimentary conditions that accompanied early aviation training. To complete her image transformation, she also cropped her hair short in the style of other female flyers. Six months later in the summer of 1921, Earhart purchased a secondhand bright chromium yellow Kinner Airster biplane, against Snook's advice, which she nicknamed "The Canary". After her first successful solo landing, she bought a new leather flying coat. Due to the newness of the coat, she was subjected to teasing, so she aged her coat by sleeping in it and staining it with aircraft oil.

On May 16, 1923, Earhart became the 16th woman in the United States to be issued a pilot's license (#6017) by the Fédération Aéronautique Internationale (FAI).

Aviation career and marriage

Financial crisis 

Throughout the early 1920s, following a disastrous investment in a failed gypsum mine, Earhart's inheritance from her grandmother, which was now administered by her mother, steadily diminished until it was exhausted. Consequently, with no immediate prospects for recouping her investment in flying, Earhart sold the "Canary" as well as a second Kinner and bought a yellow Kissel Gold Bug "Speedster" two-seat automobile, which she named the "Yellow Peril". Simultaneously, Earhart experienced an exacerbation of her old sinus problem as her pain worsened and in early 1924 she was hospitalized for another sinus operation, which was again unsuccessful. After trying her hand at a number of ventures that included setting up a photography company, Earhart set out in a new direction.

Boston 

Following her parents' divorce in 1924, she drove her mother in the "Yellow Peril" on a transcontinental trip from California with stops throughout the western United States and a jaunt up to Banff, Alberta. The meandering tour eventually brought the pair to Boston, Massachusetts, where Earhart underwent another sinus operation which was more successful. After recuperation, she returned to Columbia University for several months but was forced to abandon her studies and any further plans for enrolling at the Massachusetts Institute of Technology, because her mother could no longer afford the tuition fees and associated costs. Soon after, she found employment first as a teacher, then as a social worker in 1925 at Denison House, a Boston settlement house. At this time, she lived in Medford, Massachusetts.

When Earhart lived in Medford, she maintained her interest in aviation, becoming a member of the American Aeronautical Society's Boston chapter and was eventually elected its vice president. She flew out of Dennison Airport (later the Naval Air Station Squantum) in Quincy, Massachusetts, and helped finance its operation by investing a small sum of money. Earhart also flew the first official flight out of Dennison Airport in 1927. Along with acting as a sales representative for Kinner Aircraft in the Boston area, Earhart wrote local newspaper columns promoting flying and as her local celebrity grew, she laid out the plans for an organization devoted to female flyers.

Transatlantic flight in 1928 

After Charles Lindbergh's solo flight across the Atlantic in 1927, Amy Guest (1873–1959) expressed interest in being the first woman to fly (or be flown) across the Atlantic Ocean. After deciding that the trip was too perilous for her to undertake, she offered to sponsor the project, suggesting that they find "another girl with the right image". While at work one afternoon in April 1928, Earhart got a phone call from Capt. Hilton H. Railey, who asked her, "Would you like to fly the Atlantic?"

The project coordinators (including book publisher and publicist George P. Putnam) interviewed Earhart and asked her to accompany pilot Wilmer Stultz and copilot/mechanic Louis Gordon on the flight, nominally as a passenger, but with the added duty of keeping the flight log. The team departed from Trepassey Harbor, Newfoundland, in a Fokker F.VIIb/3m named "Friendship" on June 17, 1928, landing at Pwll near Burry Port, South Wales, exactly 20 hours and 40 minutes later. There is a commemorative blue plaque at the site. Since most of the flight was on instruments and Earhart had no training for this type of flying, she did not pilot the aircraft. When interviewed after landing, she said, "Stultz did all the flying—had to. I was just baggage, like a sack of potatoes." She added, "... maybe someday I'll try it alone."

Earhart reportedly received a rousing welcome on June 19, 1928, when she landed at Woolston in Southampton, England. She flew the Avro Avian 594 Avian III, SN: R3/AV/101 owned by Lady Mary Heath and later purchased the aircraft and had it shipped back to the United States (where it was assigned "unlicensed aircraft identification mark" 7083).

When the Stultz, Gordon, and Earhart flight crew returned to the United States on July 6, they were greeted with a ticker-tape parade along the Canyon of Heroes in Manhattan, followed by a reception with President Calvin Coolidge at the White House.

Celebrity image 

Trading on her physical resemblance to Lindbergh, whom the press had dubbed "Lucky Lindy", some newspapers and magazines began referring to Earhart as "Lady Lindy". The United Press was more grandiloquent; to them, Earhart was the reigning "Queen of the Air". Immediately after her return to the United States, she undertook an exhausting lecture tour in 1928 and 1929. Meanwhile, Putnam had undertaken to heavily promote her in a campaign that included publishing a book she authored, a series of new lecture tours and using pictures of her in mass-market endorsements for products including luggage, Lucky Strike cigarettes (this caused image problems for her, with McCall's magazine retracting an offer) and women's clothing and sportswear. The money that she made from Lucky Strike had been earmarked for a $1,500 donation to Commander Richard Byrd's imminent South Pole expedition.

The marketing campaign by both Earhart and Putnam was successful in establishing the Earhart mystique in the public psyche. Rather than simply endorsing the products, Earhart actively became involved in the promotions, especially in women's fashions. For a number of years she had sewn her own clothes, but the "active living" lines that were sold in 50 stores such as Macy's in metropolitan areas were an expression of a new Earhart image. Her concept of simple, natural lines matched with wrinkle-proof, washable materials was the embodiment of a sleek, purposeful, but feminine "A.E." (the familiar name she went by with family and friends). The luggage line that she promoted (marketed as Modernaire Earhart Luggage) also bore her unmistakable stamp.

A wide range of promotional items bearing the Earhart name appeared.

Promoting aviation 

Celebrity endorsements helped Earhart finance her flying. Accepting a position as associate editor at Cosmopolitan magazine, she turned this forum into an opportunity to campaign for greater public acceptance of aviation, especially focusing on the role of women entering the field. In 1929, Earhart was among the first aviators to promote commercial air travel through the development of a passenger airline service; along with Charles Lindbergh, she represented Transcontinental Air Transport (TAT, later TWA) alongside Margaret Bartlett Thornton and invested time and money in setting up the first regional shuttle service between New York and Washington, D.C., the Ludington Airline. She was a Vice President of National Airways, which conducted the flying operations of the Boston-Maine Airways and several other airlines in the northeast. By 1940, the company had become Northeast Airlines. In 1934 she interceded on behalf of Isabel Ebel (who had helped her in 1932) to get her accepted as the first woman student of Aeronatical Engineering at NYU.

Competitive flying 

Although Earhart had gained fame for her transatlantic flight, she endeavored to set an "untarnished" record of her own. Shortly after her return, piloting Avian 7083, she set off on her first long solo flight that occurred just as her name was coming into the national spotlight. By making the trip in August 1928, Earhart became the first woman to fly solo across the North American continent and back. Her piloting skills and professionalism gradually grew, as acknowledged by experienced professional pilots who flew with her. General Leigh Wade flew with Earhart in 1929: "She was a born flier, with a delicate touch on the stick."

Earhart subsequently made her first attempt at competitive air racing in 1929 during the first Santa Monica-to-Cleveland Women's Air Derby (nicknamed the "Powder Puff Derby" by Will Rogers), which left Santa Monica, California on August 18 and arrived at Cleveland, Ohio on August 26. During the race, she settled into fourth place in the "heavy planes" division. At the second to last stop at Columbus, her friend Ruth Nichols, who was coming in third, had an accident while on a test flight before the race recommenced. Nichols' aircraft hit a tractor at the start of the runway and flipped over, forcing her out of the race. At Cleveland, Earhart was placed third in the heavy division.

In 1930, Earhart became an official of the National Aeronautic Association, where she actively promoted the establishment of separate women's records and was instrumental in the Fédération Aéronautique Internationale (FAI) accepting a similar international standard. On April 8, 1931, she set a world altitude record of  flying a Pitcairn PCA-2 autogyro borrowed from Beech-Nut Chewing Gum.

During this period, Earhart became involved with The Ninety-Nines, an organization of female pilots providing moral support and advancing the cause of women in aviation. She had called a meeting of female pilots in 1929 following the Women's Air Derby. She suggested the name based on the number of the charter members; she later became the organization's first president in 1930. Earhart was a vigorous advocate for female pilots and when the 1934 Bendix Trophy Race banned women, she openly refused to fly screen actress Mary Pickford to Cleveland to open the races.

Marriage to George Putnam 

Earhart was engaged to Samuel Chapman, a chemical engineer from Boston; she broke off the engagement on November 23, 1928. During the same period, Earhart and publisher George P. Putnam had spent a great deal of time together. Putnam, who was known as GP, was divorced in 1929 and sought out Earhart, proposing to her six times before she finally agreed to marry him. They married on February 7, 1931, in Putnam's mother's house in Noank, Connecticut. Earhart referred to her marriage as a "partnership" with "dual control". In a letter written to Putnam and hand-delivered to him on the day of the wedding, she wrote, "I want you to understand I shall not hold you to any midaevil  code of faithfulness to me nor shall I consider myself bound to you similarly." She continued, "I may have to keep some place where I can go to be by myself, now and then, for I cannot guarantee to endure at all times the confinement of even an attractive cage."

Earhart's ideas on marriage were liberal for the time, as she believed in equal responsibilities for both breadwinners and pointedly kept her own name rather than being referred to as "Mrs. Putnam". When The New York Times, per the rules of its stylebook, insisted on referring to her as Mrs. Putnam, she laughed it off. Putnam also learned that he would be called "Mr. Earhart". There was no honeymoon for the newlyweds, as Earhart was involved in a nine-day cross-country tour promoting autogyros and the tour sponsor, Beech-Nut chewing gum. Although Earhart and Putnam never had children, he had two sons by his previous marriage to Dorothy Binney (1888–1982), a chemical heiress whose father's company, Binney & Smith, invented Crayola crayons: the explorer and writer David Binney Putnam (1913–1992) and George Palmer Putnam, Jr. (1921–2013). Earhart was especially fond of David, who frequently visited his father at their family home, which was on the grounds of The Apawamis Club in Rye, New York. George had contracted polio shortly after his parents' separation and was unable to visit as often.

Transatlantic solo flight in 1932 

On the morning of May 20, 1932, 34-year-old Earhart set off from Harbour Grace, Newfoundland, with a copy of the Telegraph-Journal, given to her by journalist Stuart Trueman to confirm the date of the flight. She intended to fly to Paris in her single engine Lockheed Vega 5B to emulate Charles Lindbergh's solo flight five years earlier. Her technical advisor for the flight was famed Norwegian American aviator Bernt Balchen, who helped prepare her aircraft. He also played the role of "decoy" for the press as he was ostensibly preparing Earhart's Vega for his own Arctic flight. After a flight lasting 14 hours, 56 minutes, during which she contended with strong northerly winds, icy conditions and mechanical problems, Earhart landed in a pasture at Culmore, north of Derry, Northern Ireland. The landing was witnessed by Cecil King and T. Sawyer. When a farm hand asked, "Have you flown far?" Earhart replied, "From America".

As the first woman to fly solo nonstop across the Atlantic, Earhart received the Distinguished Flying Cross from Congress, the Cross of Knight of the Legion of Honor from the French Government and the Gold Medal of the National Geographic Society from President Herbert Hoover. As her fame grew, she developed friendships with many people in high offices, most notably First Lady Eleanor Roosevelt. Roosevelt shared many of Earhart's interests and passions, especially women's causes. After flying with Earhart, Roosevelt obtained a student permit but did not further pursue her plans to learn to fly. The two friends communicated frequently throughout their lives. Another flyer, Jacqueline Cochran, who was said to be Earhart's rival, also became her confidante during this period.

Additional solo flights 

On January 11, 1935, Earhart became the first aviator to fly solo from Honolulu, Hawaii, to Oakland, California. This time, she used a Lockheed 5C Vega. Although this transoceanic flight had been attempted by many others, notably by the unfortunate participants in the 1927 Dole Air Race that had reversed the route, her trailblazing flight had been mainly routine, with no mechanical breakdowns. In her final hours, she even relaxed and listened to "the broadcast of the Metropolitan Opera from New York".

That year, once more flying her Lockheed Vega airliner that Earhart had tagged "old Bessie, the fire horse", she flew solo from Los Angeles to Mexico City on April 19. The next record attempt was a nonstop flight from Mexico City to New York. Setting off on May 8, her flight was uneventful, although the large crowds that greeted her at Newark, New Jersey, were a concern, because she had to be careful not to taxi into the throng.

The race had been a particularly difficult one, as a competitor, Cecil Allen, died in a fiery takeoff mishap, and rival Jacqueline Cochran was forced to pull out due to mechanical problems. In addition, "blinding fog" and violent thunderstorms plagued the race.

Between 1930 and 1935, Earhart had set seven women's speed and distance aviation records in a variety of aircraft, including the Kinner Airster, Lockheed Vega, and Pitcairn Autogiro. By 1935, recognizing the limitations of her "lovely red Vega" in long, transoceanic flights, Earhart contemplated, in her own words, a new "prize ... one flight which I most wanted to attempt – a circumnavigation of the globe as near its waistline as could be". For the new venture, she would need a new aircraft.

Move from New York to California 

While Earhart was away on a speaking tour in late November 1934, a fire broke out at the Putnam residence in Rye, destroying many family treasures and Earhart's personal mementos. Putnam had already sold his interest in the New York-based publishing company to his cousin, Palmer Putnam. Following the fire, the couple decided to move to the West Coast, where Putnam took up his new position as head of the editorial board of Paramount Pictures in North Hollywood. While speaking in California in late 1934, Earhart had contacted Hollywood "stunt" pilot Paul Mantz in order to improve her flying, focusing especially on long-distance flying in her Vega, and wanted to move closer to him.

At Earhart's urging, Putnam purchased a small house in June 1935 adjacent to the clubhouse of the Lakeside Golf Club in Toluca Lake, a San Fernando Valley celebrity enclave community nestled between the Warner Brothers and Universal Pictures studio complexes, where they had earlier rented a temporary residence. Earhart and Putnam would not move in immediately, however; they decided to do considerable remodeling and enlarge the existing small structure to meet their needs. This delayed the occupation of their new home for several months.

In September 1935, Earhart and Mantz formally established a business partnership that they had been considering since late 1934, by creating the short-lived Earhart-Mantz Flying School, which Mantz controlled and operated through his aviation company, United Air Services. The company was located at the Burbank Airport, about five miles (8 km) from Earhart's Toluca Lake home. Putnam handled publicity for the school that primarily taught instrument flying using Link Trainers.

World flight in 1937

Planning 

In 1935, Earhart joined Purdue University as a visiting faculty member to counsel women on careers and as a technical advisor to its Department of Aeronautics. Early in 1936, Earhart started planning a round-the-world flight. Although others had flown around the world, her flight would be the longest at 29,000 miles (47,000 km) because it followed a roughly equatorial route. With financing from Purdue, in July 1936, a Lockheed Electra 10E (reg. NR16020) was built at Lockheed Aircraft Company to her specifications, which included extensive modifications to the fuselage to incorporate many additional fuel tanks. Earhart dubbed the twin engine monoplane her "flying laboratory". The plane was built at Lockheed's Burbank, California, plant, and after delivery it was hangared at Mantz's United Air Services, which was just across the airfield from the Lockheed plant.

Although the Electra was publicized as a "flying laboratory", little useful science was planned and the flight was arranged around Earhart's intention to circumnavigate the globe along with gathering raw material and public attention for her next book. Manning was not only a navigator, but he was also a pilot and a skilled radio operator who knew Morse code.

The original plan was a two-person crew. Earhart would fly and Manning would navigate. During a flight across the country that included Earhart, Manning, and Putnam, Earhart flew using landmarks. She and Putnam knew where they were. Manning did a navigation fix, but that fix alarmed Putnam, because Manning's position put them in the wrong state. They were flying close to the state line, so the navigation error was minor, but Putnam was still concerned. Sometime later, Putnam and Mantz arranged a night flight to test Manning's navigational skill. Under poor navigational conditions, Manning's position was off by 20 miles. Elgen M. and Marie K. Long consider Manning's performance reasonable because it was within an acceptable error of 30 miles, but Mantz and Putnam wanted a better navigator.

Through contacts in the Los Angeles aviation community, Fred Noonan was subsequently chosen as a second navigator because there were significant additional factors that had to be dealt with while using celestial navigation for aircraft. Noonan was experienced in both marine (he was a licensed ship's captain) and flight navigation. Noonan had recently left Pan Am, where he established most of the company's China Clipper seaplane routes across the Pacific. Noonan had also been responsible for training Pan American's navigators for the route between San Francisco and Manila. The original plans were for Noonan to navigate from Hawaii to Howland Island, a particularly difficult portion of the flight; then Manning would continue with Earhart to Australia and she would proceed on her own for the remainder of the project.

First attempt 
On March 17, 1937, Earhart and her crew flew the first leg from Oakland, California, to Honolulu, Hawaii. In addition to Earhart and Noonan, Harry Manning and Mantz (who was acting as Earhart's technical advisor) were on board. Due to lubrication and galling problems with the propeller hubs' variable pitch mechanisms, the aircraft needed servicing in Hawaii. Ultimately, the Electra ended up at the United States Navy's Luke Field on Ford Island in Pearl Harbor. The flight resumed three days later from Luke Field with Earhart, Noonan and Manning on board. The next destination was Howland Island, a small island in the Pacific. Manning, the only skilled radio operator, had made arrangements to use radio direction finding to home in to the island. The flight never left Luke Field. During the takeoff run, there was an uncontrolled ground-loop, the forward landing gear collapsed, both propellers hit the ground, the plane skidded on its belly, and a portion of the runway was damaged. The cause of the ground-loop is controversial. Some witnesses at Luke Field, including the Associated Press journalist, said they saw a tire blow. Earhart thought either the Electra's right tire had blown and/or the right landing gear had collapsed. Some sources, including Mantz, cited pilot error.

With the aircraft severely damaged, the flight was called off and the aircraft was shipped by sea to the Lockheed Burbank facility for repairs.

Manning, having taken a leave of absence to do the flight, felt that there had been too many problems and delays. He ended his association with the trip, leaving only Earhart with Noonan, neither of whom were skilled radio operators.

Second attempt 

While the Electra was being repaired, Earhart and Putnam secured additional funds and prepared for a second attempt. This time flying west to east, the second attempt began with an unpublicized flight from Oakland to Miami, Florida, and after arriving there Earhart publicly announced her plans to circumnavigate the globe. The flight's opposite direction was partly the result of changes in global wind and weather patterns along the planned route since the earlier attempt. On this second flight, Fred Noonan was Earhart's only crew member. The pair departed Miami on June 1 and after numerous stops in South America, Africa, the Indian subcontinent and Southeast Asia, arrived at Lae, New Guinea, on June 29, 1937. At this stage, about 22,000 miles (35,000 km) of the journey had been completed. The remaining 7,000 miles (11,000 km) would be over the Pacific.

Departure from Lae 

On July 2, 1937 at 10:00 in the morning (midnight GMT), Earhart and Noonan took off from Lae Airfield in the heavily loaded Electra. The expected flying time was about 20 hours, so, accounting for the 2-hour time-zone difference between Lae and Howland and crossing of the International Dateline, the aircraft was expected to arrive at Howland the morning of the next day, 2 July. The aircraft departed Lae with about 1100 gallons of gasoline.

In March 1937, Kelly Johnson had recommended engine and altitude settings for the Electra. One of the recommended schedules was:

Earhart used part of the above schedule for the Oakland to Honolulu leg of the first world flight attempt. Johnson estimated that 900 gallons of fuel would provide 40% more range than required for that leg. The Oakland to Honolulu leg had Earhart, Noonan, Manning, and Mantz on board. The flight from Oakland to Honolulu took 16 hours. The Electra also loaded 900 gallons of fuel for the shorter Honolulu to Howland leg (with only Earhart, Noonan, and Manning on board), but the airplane crashed on take off; the crash ended the first world flight attempt.

Around 3 pm Lae time, Earhart reported her altitude as 10,000 ft but that they would reduce altitude due to thick clouds. Around 5 pm, Earhart reported her altitude as 7,000 ft and speed as 150 knots.

Their last known position report was near the Nukumanu Islands, about  into the flight.

During the flight, Noonan may have been able to do some celestial navigation to determine his position. If crossing the International Dateline was not taken into account, a 1° or 60 mile position error would result.

Radio equipment 
In preparation for the trip to Howland Island, the U.S. Coast Guard had sent the cutter  to the island. The cutter offered many services such as ferrying news reporters to the island, but it also had communication and navigation functions. The plan was the cutter could: communicate with Earhart's aircraft via radio; transmit a radio homing signal to make it easy to find Howland Island without precise celestial navigation; do radio direction finding if Earhart used her 500 kHz transmitter; use an experimental high-frequency direction finder for Earhart's voice transmissions; and use her boilers to "make smoke" (create a dark column of smoke that can be seen over the horizon). All of the navigation methods would fail to guide Earhart to Howland Island.

The Electra had radio equipment for both communication and navigation, but details about that equipment are not clear. Many explanations have been proposed for those failures.

The plane had a modified Western Electric model 13C transmitter. The 50-watt transmitter was crystal controlled and capable of transmitting on 500 kHz, 3105 kHz, and 6210 kHz. Crystal control means that the transmitter cannot be tuned to other frequencies; the plane could transmit only on those three frequencies. The transmitter had been modified at the factory to provide the 500 kHz capability.

The plane had a modified Western Electric model 20B receiver. Ordinarily, the receiver covered four frequency bands: 188–420 kHz, 550–1500 kHz, 1500–4000 kHz, and 4000–10000 kHz. The receiver was modified to lower the frequencies in the second band to 485–1200 kHz. That modification allowed the reception of 500 kHz signals; such signals were used for marine distress calls and radio navigation. The model 20B receiver has two antenna inputs: a low-frequency antenna input and a high-frequency antenna input. The receiver's band selector also selects which antenna input is used; the first two bands use the low-frequency antenna, and the last two bands select the high-frequency antenna.

It is unknown whether the model 20B receiver had a beat frequency oscillator that would enable the detection of continuous wave transmissions such as Morse code and radiolocation beacons. Neither Earhart nor Noonan were capable of using Morse code. They relied on voice communications. Manning, who was on the first world flight attempt but not the second, was skilled at Morse and had acquired an FCC aircraft radiotelegraph license for 15 words per minute in March 1937, just prior to the start of the first flight.

A separate automatic radio direction finder receiver, a prototype Hooven Radio Compass, had been installed in the plane in October 1936, but that receiver was removed before the flight to save weight. The Hooven Radio Compass was replaced with a Bendix coupling unit that allowed a conventional loop antenna to be attached to an existing receiver (i.e., the Western Electric 20B). The loop antenna is visible above the cockpit on Earhart's plane.

Alternatively, the loop antenna may have been connected to a Bendix RA-1 auxiliary receiver with direction finding capability up to 1500 kHz. It is not clear that such a receiver was installed, and if it were, it may have been removed before the flight. Elgen and Marie Long describe Joe Gurr training Earhart to use a Bendix receiver and other equipment to tune radio station KFI on 640 kHz and determine its direction.

Whichever receiver was used, there are pictures of Earhart's radio direction finder loop antenna and its 5-band Bendix coupling unit. The details of the loop and its coupler are not clear. Elgen and Marie Long claim that the coupling unit adapted a standard RDF-1-B loop to the RA-1 receiver, and that the system was limited to frequencies below 1430 kHz. During the first world flight attempt's leg from Honolulu to Howland (when Manning was a navigator), Itasca was supposed to transmit a CW homing beacon at either 375 kHz or 500 kHz. At least twice during the world flight, Earhart failed to determine radio bearings at 7500 kHz. If the RDF equipment was not suitable for that frequency, then attempting such a fix would be operator error and fruitless. However, the earlier 7-band Navy RDF-1-A covered 500 kHz–8000 kHz. The later 3-band DU-1 covered 200 kHz–1600 kHz. It is not clear where the RDF-1-B or Earhart's coupler performance sits between those two units. In addition, the RDF-1-A and DU-1 coupler designs have other differences. The intention is to have the ordinary receive antenna connected to the coupler's antenna input; from there, it is passed on to the receiver. In the RDF-1-A design, the coupler must be powered on for that design function to work. In the later DU-1 design, the coupler need not be powered.

There were problems with the RDF equipment during the world flight. During the transatlantic leg of the flight (Brazil to Africa), the RDF equipment did not work. The radio direction finding station at Darwin expected to be in contact with Earhart when she arrived there, but Earhart stated that the RDF was not functioning; the problem was a blown fuse. During a test flight at Lae, Earhart could hear radio signals, but she failed to obtain an RDF bearing. While apparently near Howland Island, Earhart reported receiving a 7500 kHz signal from Itasca, but she was unable to obtain an RDF bearing.

The antennas and their connections on the Electra are not certain. A dorsal Vee antenna was added by Bell Telephone Laboratories. There had been a trailing wire antenna for 500 kHz, but the Luke Field accident collapsed both landing gear and wiped off the ventral antennas. After the accident, the trailing wire antenna was removed, the dorsal antenna was modified, and a ventral antenna was installed. It is not certain, but it is likely that the dorsal antenna was only connected to the transmitter (i.e., no "break in" relay), and the ventral antenna was only connected to the receiver. Once the second world flight started, problems with radio reception were noticed while flying across the US; Pan Am technicians may have modified the ventral antenna while the plane was in Miami. At Lae, problems with transmission quality on 6210 kHz were noticed. Once the flight took off from Lae, Lae did not receive radio messages on 6210 kHz (Earhart's daytime frequency) until four hours later (at 2:18 pm); Lae's last reception was at 5:18 pm and was a strong signal; Lae received nothing after that; presumably the plane switched to 3105 kHz (Earhart's nighttime frequency). Itasca heard Earhart on 3105 kHz, but did not hear her on 6210 kHz. TIGHAR postulates that the ventral receiving antenna was scraped off while the Electra taxied to the runway at Lae; consequently, the Electra lost its ability to receive HF transmissions.

Nearing Howland Island 

The USCGC Itasca was on station at Howland. Its task was to communicate with Earhart's Electra and guide them to the island once they arrived in the vicinity. Noonan and Earhart expected to do voice communications on 3105 kHz during the night and 6210 kHz during the day.

Through a series of misunderstandings or errors (the details of which are still controversial), the final approach to Howland Island using radio navigation was not successful. Fred Noonan had earlier written about problems affecting the accuracy of radio direction finding in navigation. Another cited cause of possible confusion was that the Itasca and Earhart planned their communication schedule using time systems set a half-hour apart, with Earhart using Greenwich Civil Time (GCT) and the Itasca under a Naval time zone designation system.

The Electra expected Itasca to transmit signals that the Electra could use as an RDF beacon to find the Itasca.  In theory, the plane could listen for the signal while rotating its loop antenna. A sharp minimum indicates the direction of the RDF beacon. The Electra's RDF equipment had failed due to a blown fuse during an earlier leg flying to Darwin; the fuse was replaced. Near Howland, Earhart could hear the transmission from Itasca on 7500 kHz, but she was unable to determine a minimum, so she could not determine a direction to Itasca. Earhart was also unable to determine a minimum during an RDF test at Lae. One likely theory is that Earhart's RDF equipment did not work at 7500 kHz; most RDF equipment at the time was not designed to work above 2000 kHz. When operated above their design frequency, loop antennas lose their directionality.

Itasca had its own RDF equipment, but that equipment did not work above 550 kHz, so Itasca could not determine the direction to the Electra's HF transmissions at 3105 and 6210 kHz. The Electra had been equipped to transmit a 500 kHz signal that Itasca could use for radio direction finding, but some of that equipment had been removed. The equipment originally used a long trailing wire antenna. While the plane was in flight, the wire antenna would be paid out at the tail; efficient transmissions at 500 kHz needed a long antenna. The antenna was bulky and heavy, so the trailing wire antenna was removed to save weight. If nothing else had been done, the plane would have been unable to transmit an RDF signal that Itasca could use. Such a modification was made, but without voice communication from Itasca to the plane, the ship could not tell the plane to use its 500 kHz signal. Even if Itasca could get a bearing to the plane, the Itasca could not tell the plane that bearing, so the plane could not head to the ship.

Some sources have noted Earhart's apparent lack of understanding of her direction-finding system, which had been fitted to the aircraft just prior to the flight. The system was equipped with a new receiver from Bendix that operated on five wavelength "bands", marked 1 to 5. The loop antenna was equipped with a tuneable loading coil that changed the effective length of the antenna to allow it to work efficiently at different wavelengths. The tuner on the antenna was also marked with five settings, 1 to 5, but, critically, these were not the same frequency bands as the corresponding bands on the radio. The two were close enough for settings 1, 2 and 3, but the higher frequency settings, 4 and 5, were entirely different. The upper bands (4 and 5) could not be used for direction finding. Earhart's only training on the system was a brief introduction by Joe Gurr at the Lockheed factory, and the topic had not come up. A card displaying the band settings of the antenna was mounted so it was not visible. Gurr explained that higher frequency bands would offer better accuracy and longer range.

Motion picture evidence from Lae suggests that an antenna mounted underneath the fuselage may have been torn off from the fuel-heavy Electra during taxi or takeoff from Lae's turf runway, though no antenna was reported found at Lae.

Radio signals 

During Earhart and Noonan's approach to Howland Island, the Itasca received strong and clear voice transmissions from Earhart identifying as KHAQQ, but she apparently was unable to hear voice transmissions from the ship. Signals from the ship would also be used for direction finding, implying that the aircraft's direction finder was also not functional.

The first calls, routine reports stating the weather as cloudy and overcast, were received at 2:45 and just before 5 am on July 2. These calls were broken up by static, but at this point the aircraft would still be a long distance from Howland.

At 6:14 am another call was received stating the aircraft was within , and requested that the ship use its direction finder to provide a bearing for the aircraft. Earhart began whistling into the microphone to provide a continual signal for them to home in on. It was at this point that the radio operators on the Itasca realized that their RDF system could not tune in the aircraft's 3105 kHz frequency; radioman Leo Bellarts later commented that he "was sitting there sweating blood because I couldn't do a darn thing about it." A similar call asking for a bearing was received at 6:45 am, when Earhart estimated they were  out.

An Itasca radio log (position 1) at 7:30–7:40 am states:

Another Itasca radio log (position 2) at 7:42 am states:

Earhart's 7:58 am transmission said she could not hear the Itasca and asked them to send voice signals so she could try to take a radio bearing. This transmission was reported by the Itasca as the loudest possible signal, indicating Earhart and Noonan were in the immediate area. They could not send voice at the frequency she asked for, so Morse code signals were sent instead. Earhart acknowledged receiving these but said she was unable to determine their direction.

In her last known transmission at 8:43 am Earhart broadcast "We are on the line 157 337. We will repeat this message. We will repeat this on 6210 kilocycles. Wait." However, a few moments later she was back on the same frequency (3105 kHz) with a transmission that was logged as "questionable": "We are running on line north and south." Earhart's transmissions seemed to indicate she and Noonan believed they had reached Howland's charted position, which was incorrect by about five nautical miles (10 km). The Itasca used her oil-fired boilers to generate smoke for a period of time, but the fliers apparently did not see it. The many scattered clouds in the area around Howland Island have also been cited as a problem: their dark shadows on the ocean surface may have been almost indistinguishable from the island's subdued and very flat profile.

Whether any post-loss radio signals were received from Earhart and Noonan remains unclear. If transmissions were received from the Electra, most if not all were weak and hopelessly garbled. Earhart's voice transmissions to Howland were on 3105 kHz, a frequency restricted in the United States by the FCC to aviation use. This frequency was thought to be not fit for broadcasts over great distances. Moreover, the 50-watt transmitter used by Earhart was attached to a less-than-optimum-length V-type antenna.

The last voice transmission received on Howland Island from Earhart indicated she and Noonan were flying along a line of position (running N–S on 157–337 degrees) which Noonan would have calculated and drawn on a chart as passing through Howland. After all contact was lost with Howland Island, attempts were made to reach the flyers with both voice and Morse code transmissions. Operators across the Pacific and the United States may have heard signals from the downed Electra but these were unintelligible or weak.

Some of these reports of transmissions were later determined to be hoaxes but others were deemed authentic. Bearings taken by Pan American Airways stations suggested signals originating from several locations, including Gardner Island (Nikumaroro), 360 miles (580 km) to the SSE. It was noted at the time that if these signals were from Earhart and Noonan, they must have been on land with the aircraft since water would have otherwise shorted out the Electra's electrical system. Sporadic signals were reported for four or five days after the disappearance but none yielded any understandable information. The captain of  later said: "There was no doubt many stations were calling the Earhart plane on the plane's frequency, some by voice and others by signals. All of these added to the confusion and doubtfulness of the authenticity of the reports."

Contemporaneous search efforts 

Beginning approximately one hour after Earhart's last recorded message, the USCGC Itasca undertook an ultimately unsuccessful search north and west of Howland Island based on initial assumptions about transmissions from the aircraft. The United States Navy (USN) soon joined the search and over a period of about three days sent available resources to the search area in the vicinity of Howland Island. The initial search by the Itasca involved running up the 157/337 line of position to the NNW from Howland Island. The Itasca then searched the area to the immediate NE of the island, corresponding to the area, yet wider than the area searched to the NW. Based on bearings of several supposed Earhart radio transmissions, some of the search efforts were directed to a specific position on a line of 281 degrees (approximately northwest) from Howland Island without evidence of the flyers. Four days after Earhart's last verified radio transmission, on July 6, 1937, the captain of the battleship Colorado received orders from the Commandant, Fourteenth Naval District to take over all naval and coast guard units to coordinate search efforts.

Later search efforts were directed to the Phoenix Islands south of Howland Island. A week after the disappearance, naval aircraft from the Colorado flew over several islands in the group including Gardner Island (now called Nikumaroro), which had been uninhabited for over 40 years. The subsequent report on Gardner read: "Here signs of recent habitation were clearly visible but repeated circling and zooming failed to elicit any answering wave from possible inhabitants and it was finally taken for granted that none were there... At the western end of the island a tramp steamer (of about 4000 tons)... lay high and almost dry head onto the coral beach with her back broken in two places. The lagoon at Gardner looked sufficiently deep and certainly large enough so that a seaplane or even an airboat could have landed or takenoff  in any direction with little if any difficulty. Given a chance, it is believed that Miss Earhart could have landed her aircraft in this lagoon and swum or waded ashore." They also found that Gardner's shape and size as recorded on charts were wholly inaccurate. Other Navy search efforts were again directed north, west and southwest of Howland Island, based on a possibility the Electra had ditched in the ocean, was afloat, or that the aviators were in an emergency raft.

The official search efforts lasted until July 19, 1937. At $4 million, the air and sea search by the Navy and Coast Guard was the most costly and intensive in U.S. history up to that time, but search and rescue techniques during the era were rudimentary and some of the search was based on erroneous assumptions and flawed information. Official reporting of the search effort was influenced by individuals wary about how their roles in looking for an American hero might be reported by the press. Despite an unprecedented search by the United States Navy and Coast Guard, no physical evidence of Earhart, Noonan or the Electra 10E was found.

Immediately after the end of the official search, Putnam financed a private search by local authorities of nearby Pacific islands and waters, concentrating on the Gilberts. In late July 1937, Putnam chartered two small boats, and, while he remained in the United States, directed a search of the Phoenix Islands, Christmas (Kiritimati) Island, Fanning (Tabuaeran) Island, the Gilbert Islands, and the Marshall Islands, but no trace of the Electra or its occupants was found.

Back in the United States, Putnam acted to become the trustee of Earhart's estate so that he could pay for the searches and related bills. In probate court in Los Angeles, Putnam requested to have the "declared death in absentia" seven-year waiting period waived so that he could manage Earhart's finances. As a result, Earhart was declared legally dead on January 5, 1939.

Speculation on disappearance 

There has been considerable speculation on what happened to Earhart and Noonan. Most historians hold to the simple "crash and sink" theory, but a number of other possibilities have been proposed, including several conspiracy theories.

Some have suggested that Earhart and Noonan survived and landed elsewhere, but were either never found or killed, making en-route locations like Tarawa unlikely. Proposals have included the uninhabited Gardner Island,  from the vicinity of Howland, the Japanese-controlled Marshall Islands,  at the closest point of Mili Atoll, and the Japanese-controlled Northern Mariana Islands,  from Howland.

Crash-and-sink theory 

Many researchers believe that Earhart and Noonan ran out of fuel while searching for Howland Island, ditched at sea, and died. The plane would have carried enough fuel to reach Howland with some extra to spare. The extra fuel would cover some contingencies such as headwinds and searching for Howland. The plane could fly a compass course toward Howland through the night. In the morning, the time of apparent sunrise would allow the plane to determine its line of position (a "sun line" that ran 157°–337°). From that line, the plane could determine how much farther it must travel before reaching a parallel sun line that ran through Howland. 

As the plane closed with the island, it expected to be in radio contact with Itasca. With the radio contact, the plane should have been able to use radio direction finding (RDF) to head directly for the Itasca and Howland. The plane was not receiving a radio signal from Itasca, so it would have been unable to determine a respective RDF bearing. Although Itasca was receiving HF radio signals from the plane, it did not have HF RDF equipment, so it could not determine a bearing to the plane. Almost no communications were transmitted to the plane. Consequently, the plane was not directed to Howland, and was left on its own with little fuel. Presumably, the plane reached the parallel sun line and started searching for Howland on that line of position. 

At 7:42 AM, Earhart reported, "We must be on you, but cannot see you – but gas is running low. Have been unable to reach you by radio. We are flying at 1,000 feet." At 8:43 AM, Earhart reported, "We are on the line 157 337. We will repeat this message. We will repeat this on 6210 kilocycles. Wait." Between Earhart's low-on-fuel message at 7:42 AM and her last confirmed message at 8:43, her signal strength remained consistent, indicating that she never left the immediate Howland area as she ran out of fuel. The U.S. Coast Guard made this determination by tracking her signal strength as she approached the island, noting signal levels from her reports of 200 and 100 miles out. These reports were roughly 30 minutes apart, providing vital ground-speed clues. Based on these facts, and the lack of additional signals from Earhart, the Coast Guard first responders initiating the search concluded that she ran out of fuel somewhere very close to and north of Howland.

During the 1970s, retired USN captain Laurance Safford began a lengthy analysis of the flight. His research included the intricate radio transmission documentation. Safford concluded that the flight had suffered from "poor planning, worse execution". 

In 1982, retired USN rear admiral Richard R. Black, who was in administrative charge of the Howland Island airstrip and was present in the radio room on the Itasca, asserted that "the Electra went into the sea about 10 am, July 2, 1937, not far from Howland". 

British aviation historian Roy Nesbit interpreted evidence in contemporary accounts and Putnam's correspondence and concluded that Earhart's Electra was not fully fueled at Lae. 

William L. Polhemous, the navigator on Ann Pellegreno's 1967 flight that followed Earhart and Noonan's original flight path, studied navigational tables for July 2, 1937, and thought Noonan may have miscalculated the "single line approach" intended to "hit" Howland.

David Jourdan, a former Navy submariner and ocean engineer specializing in deep-sea recoveries, has claimed that any transmissions attributed to Gardner Island were false. Through his company Nauticos, he extensively searched a  quadrant north and west of Howland Island during two deep-sea sonar expeditions (2002 and 2006, total cost $4.5 million) and found nothing. The search locations were derived from the line of position (157–337) broadcast by Earhart on July 2, 1937. Nevertheless, Elgen Long's interpretations have led Jourdan to conclude, "The analysis of all the data we have – the fuel analysis, the radio calls, other things – tells me she went into the water off Howland." 

Earhart's stepson George Palmer Putnam Jr. has been quoted as saying he believes "the plane just ran out of gas". 

Tom D. Crouch, senior curator of the National Air and Space Museum, has said the Electra is "18,000 ft. down" and compares its archaeological significance to the Titanic, saying, "the mystery is part of what keeps us interested. In part, we remember her because she's our favorite missing person."

Gardner Island hypothesis 

The Gardner Island hypothesis assumes that Earhart and Noonan, unable to find Howland Island, would not waste time searching for it, instead turning to the south to look for other islands. One of the Phoenix Islands, known as Gardner Island (now Nikumaroro), has been the subject of inquiry as a possible crash-landing site.

A week after Earhart disappeared, Navy planes from USS Colorado (which had sailed from Pearl Harbor) searched Gardner Island. After the Navy ended its search, G. P. Putnam undertook a search in the Phoenix Group and other islands, but nothing was found.
In October 1937, Eric Bevington and Henry E. Maude visited Gardner with some potential settlers. A group walked all the way around the island, but did not find a plane or other evidence.
In December 1938, laborers landed on the island and started constructing a settlement.
In late 1939,  did a survey of the island.

Around April 1940, a skull was discovered and buried, but British colonial officer Gerald Gallagher did not learn of it until September. Gallagher did a more thorough search of the discovery area, including looking for artifacts such as rings. The search found more bones, a bottle, a shoe, and a sextant box. On September 23, 1940, Gallagher radioed his superiors that he had found a "skeleton ... possibly that of a woman", along with an old-fashioned sextant box (later revealed to have been left during a recent hydrographic survey), under a tree on the island's southeast corner. Gallagher stated that the "Bones look more than four years old to me but there seems to be very slight chance that this may be remains of Amelia Earhart." He was ordered to send the remains to Fiji. On 4 April 1941, Dr. D. W. Hoodless of the Central Medical School (later named the Fiji School of Medicine) examined the bones, took measurements, and wrote a report. Hoodless wrote that the skeleton "could be that of a short, stocky, muscular European, or even a half-caste, or person of mixed European descent." Hoodless also wrote that "it may be definitely stated that the skeleton is that of a MALE. Owing to the weather-beaten condition of all the bones it is impossible to be dogmatic in regard to the age of the person at the time of death, but I am of the opinion that he was not less than 45 years of age and that probably he was older: say between 45 and 55 years." Earhart was just under 40 years old when she disappeared. Hoodless offered to make more detailed measurements if needed, but suggested that any further examination be done by the Anthropological Department at Sydney University. These bones were apparently misplaced in Fiji and presumed lost. Around the turn of the 21st century, researchers used Hoodless's measurements to argue against his conclusions that the bones were that of a male. In two 2015 episodes of Expedition Unknown, host Josh Gates searched under a house which had belonged to another doctor from the Fiji School of Medicine, where in 1968 the house's new owner had found a box containing bones including a skull; these were brought to a local museum and lost. Gates combed several bone fragments from the area where the box had been found; these were DNA tested and determined to belong to a male.

During World War II, US Coast Guard LORAN Unit 92, a radio navigation station built in the summer and fall of 1944, and operational from mid-November 1944 until mid-May 1945, was located on Gardner Island's southeast end. Dozens of Coast Guard personnel were involved in its construction and operation, but were mostly forbidden from leaving the small base or having contact with the Gilbertese colonists then on the island, and found no artifacts known to relate to Earhart.

In 1988, The International Group for Historic Aircraft Recovery (TIGHAR) began an investigation and sent eleven research expeditions to Nikumaroro, producing inconclusive results. They have suggested that Earhart and Noonan may have flown without further radio transmissions for two and a half hours along the line of position Earhart noted in her last transmission received at Howland, then found the then-uninhabited Gardner Island, landed the Electra on an extensive reef flat near the wreck of a large freighter (the SS Norwich City) on the northwest side of the atoll, and ultimately perished.
Artifacts discovered by TIGHAR on Nikumaroro have included improvised tools, an aluminum panel, an oddly cut piece of clear Plexiglas, and a size-9 woman's shoe heel. Recently rediscovered photos of Earhart's Electra just before departure in Miami show an aluminum panel over a window on the right side. Ric Gillespie, head of TIGHAR, claimed that the aluminum panel artifact has the same dimensions and rivet pattern as the one shown in the photo "to a high degree of certainty". Based on this new evidence, Gillespie returned to the atoll in June 2015, but operations using a remotely operated underwater vehicle to investigate a sonar detection of a possible wreckage were hampered by technical problems. Further, a review of sonar data concluded it was most likely a coral ridge.
In July 2017, staff from the New England Air Museum notified TIGHAR that the unique rivet pattern of the aluminum panel precisely matched the top of the wing of a Douglas C-47 Skytrain in the museum inventory, particularly significant since a C-47B crashed on a nearby island during World War II and villagers acknowledged bringing aluminum from that wreck to Gardner Island.

Some consider TIGHAR's theory the most plausible Earhart-survival theory, although not proven and not accepted beyond crash-and-sink. Other sources have criticized TIGHAR as seizing on unlikely possibilities as circumstantial evidence; for example, an article criticized the suggestion that a jar of freckle ointment found on Nikumaroro might have been Earhart's, when the Electra was "virtually a flying gas station" with little room for amenities, as Earhart and Noonan carried extra gas tanks in every scrap of available space and absence of any corroborating evidence connecting the artifact to her.

The 2019 National Geographic special Expedition Amelia depicts an August 2019 search for Earhart's aircraft off Nikumaroro's reef conducted by ocean explorer Robert Ballard, who has found several ocean wrecks including the Titanic. Ballard was intrigued by documented radio signal bearings that intersect near Nikumaroro, although they were taken from different locations and at different times. Ballard's expedition had more sophisticated search equipment than TIGHAR used on its expedition in 2012.
He completed his expedition in October 2019. After days of searching the deep cliffs supporting the island and the nearby ocean, Ballard did not find any evidence of the plane or any associated wreckage of it. Allison Fundis, Ballard's chief operating officer of the expedition stated, "We felt like if her plane was there, we would have found it pretty early in the expedition."
The documentary states of the Gardner Island hypothesis that "It's a nice story. But like all the other evidence obtained here over the decades, there is no provable link to Amelia or her plane."

Japanese capture theory 

Another theory is that Earhart and Noonan were captured by Japanese forces, perhaps after somehow navigating to somewhere within the Japanese South Seas Mandate.

In 1966, CBS correspondent Fred Goerner published a book claiming that Earhart and Noonan were captured and executed when their aircraft crashed on the island of Saipan, part of the Northern Mariana Islands archipelago.  Saipan is more than 2,700 miles away from Howland Island, however.  Later proponents of the Japanese capture hypothesis have generally suggested the Marshall Islands instead, which while still distant from the intended location (~800 miles), is slightly more possible.

In 1990, the NBC series Unsolved Mysteries broadcast an interview with a Saipanese woman who claimed to have witnessed Earhart and Noonan's execution by Japanese soldiers. No independent confirmation has ever emerged for any of these claims. Various purported photographs of Earhart during her captivity have been identified as either fraudulent or having been taken before her final flight.

A slightly different version of the Japanese capture hypothesis is not that the Japanese captured Earhart, but rather that they shot down her plane.  Henri Keyzer-Andre, a former Pan Am pilot, propounded this view in his 1993 book Age Of Heroes: Incredible Adventures of a Pan Am Pilot and his Greatest Triumph, Unravelling the Mystery of Amelia Earhart.

Since the end of World War II, a location on Tinian, which is five miles (8 km) southwest of Saipan, had been rumored to be the grave of the two aviators. In 2004, an archaeological dig at the site failed to turn up any bones.

A recent proponent of this theory is Mike Campbell, who published the 2012 book Amelia Earhart: The Truth at Last in its favor.  Campbell cites claims from Marshall Islanders to have witnessed a crash, as well as a U.S. Army Sergeant who found a suspicious gravesite near a former Japanese prison on Saipan.

A number of Earhart's relatives have been convinced that the Japanese were somehow involved in Amelia's disappearance, citing unnamed witnesses including Japanese troops and Saipan natives. According to one cousin, the Japanese cut the Lockheed Electra into scrap and threw the pieces into the ocean, to explain why the airplane was not found in the Marshall Islands.

In 2017, a History Channel documentary called Amelia Earhart: The Lost Evidence, proposed that a photograph in the National Archives of Jaluit Atoll in the Marshall Islands was actually a picture of a captured Earhart and Noonan. The picture showed a Caucasian male on a dock who appeared to look like Noonan and a woman sitting on the dock but facing away from the camera, who was judged to have a physique and haircut resembling Earhart's. The documentary theorizes that the photo was taken after Earhart and Noonan crashed at Mili Atoll. The documentary also said that physical evidence recovered from Mili matches pieces that could have fallen off an Electra during a crash or subsequent overland move to a barge. The Lost Evidence proposed that a Japanese ship seen in the photograph was the Koshu Maru, a Japanese military ship. The Lost Evidence was quickly discredited, however, after Japanese blogger Kota Yamano found the original source of the photograph in the Archives in the National Diet Library Digital Collection.  The original source of the photo was a Japanese travel guide published in October 1935, implying that the photograph was taken in 1935 or before, and thus would be unrelated to Earhart and Noonan's 1937 disappearance. Additionally, the researcher who discovered the photo also identified the ship in the right of the photo as another ship called Koshu, seized by Allied Japanese forces during World War I, and not the Koshu Maru.

A common criticism of all versions of the Japanese capture hypothesis is that the Japanese-controlled Marshall Islands were considerably distant from Howland Island.  To reach and land there would have required Earhart and Noonan, though low on fuel, to change her northeast course as she neared Howland Island and fly hundreds of miles northwest, a feat "not supported by the basic rules of geography and navigation."  Additionally, had the Japanese found a crashed Earhart and Noonan, they would have had substantial motivation to rescue the famous aviators and be hailed as heroes.

Myths, legends, and claims 

The unresolved circumstances of Earhart's disappearance, along with her fame, attracted a great body of other claims relating to her last flight. Several unsupported theories have become known in popular culture.

Spies for FDR 

The World War II-era movie Flight for Freedom (1943) is a story of a fictional female aviator (obviously inspired by Earhart) who engages in a spying mission in the Pacific.  The movie helped further a myth that Earhart was spying on the Japanese in the Pacific at the request of the Franklin D. Roosevelt administration. By 1949, both the United Press and U.S. Army Intelligence had concluded that this rumor was groundless. Jackie Cochran, another pioneering aviator and one of Earhart's friends, made a postwar search of numerous files in Japan and was convinced that the Japanese were not involved in Earhart's disappearance.

Tokyo Rose 

A rumor that claimed that Earhart had made propaganda radio broadcasts as one of the many women compelled to serve as Tokyo Rose was investigated closely by George Putnam. According to several biographies of Earhart, Putnam investigated this rumor personally but after listening to many recordings of numerous Tokyo Roses, he did not recognize her voice among them.

New Britain 

The theory that Earhart may have turned back mid-flight has been posited.

Angwin, who had been a corporal in the 11th Battalion at the time,
reported that he and other members of a forward patrol on Japanese-occupied New Britain had found a wrecked twin-engined, unpainted all-metal aircraft. The soldiers recorded a rough position on a map, along with serial numbers seen on the wreckage. The map was found in the possession of another veteran in 1993, but subsequent searches of the area indicated failed to find a wreck.

Angwin died in 2001. David Billings, an Australian aircraft engineer, has continued to investigate his theory. Billings claims that the serial numbers written on the map, "600H/P S3HI C/N1055", represent:
 a  Pratt & Whitney R-1340-S3H1 model engine; and
 "Constructor's Number 1055", an airframe identifier.
These would be consistent with a Lockheed Electra 10E, such as that flown by Earhart, although they do not contain enough information to identify the wreck in question as NR16020.

Pacific Wrecks, a website that documents World War II-era aircraft crash sites, notes that no Electra has been reported lost in or around Papua New Guinea. Ric Gillespie of TIGHAR believes that based on Earhart's last estimated position, somewhat close to Howland Island, it was impossible for the aircraft to end up at New Britain,  and over 13 hours' flight time away.

Assuming another identity 

In November 2006, the National Geographic Channel aired episode two of the Undiscovered History series about a claim that Earhart survived the world flight, moved to New Jersey, changed her name, remarried and became Irene Craigmile Bolam. This claim had originally been raised in the book Amelia Earhart Lives (1970) by author Joe Klaas, based on the research of Major Joseph Gervais. Irene Bolam, who had been a banker in New York during the 1940s, denied being Earhart, filed a lawsuit requesting $1.5 million in damages and submitted a lengthy affidavit in which she rebutted the claims. The book's publisher, McGraw-Hill, withdrew the book from the market shortly after it was released and court records indicate that the company reached an out-of-court settlement with her. Subsequently, Bolam's personal life history was thoroughly documented by researchers, eliminating any possibility that she was Earhart. Kevin Richlin, a professional criminal forensic expert hired by National Geographic, studied photographs of both women and cited many measurable facial differences between Earhart and Bolam.

Legacy 

Earhart was a widely known international celebrity during her lifetime. Her shyly charismatic appeal, independence, persistence, coolness under pressure, courage and goal-oriented career along with the circumstances of her disappearance at a comparatively early age have driven her lasting fame in popular culture. Hundreds of articles and scores of books have been written about her life, which is often cited as a motivational tale, especially for girls. Earhart is generally regarded as a feminist icon.

Earhart's accomplishments in aviation inspired a generation of female aviators, including the more than 1,000 women pilots of the Women Airforce Service Pilots (WASP) who ferried military aircraft, towed gliders, flew target practice aircraft, and served as transport pilots during World War II.

The home where Earhart was born is now the Amelia Earhart Birthplace Museum and is maintained by The Ninety-Nines, an international group of female pilots of whom Earhart was the first elected president.

A small section of Earhart's Lockheed Electra starboard engine nacelle recovered in the aftermath of the March 1937 Hawaii crash has been confirmed as authentic and is now regarded as a control piece that will help to authenticate possible future discoveries. The evaluation of the scrap of metal was featured on an episode of History Detectives on Season 7 in 2009.

Memorial flights 

Two notable memorial flights by female aviators subsequently followed Earhart's original circumnavigational route.
 In 1967, Ann Dearing Holtgren Pellegreno and a crew of three flew a similar aircraft (a Lockheed 10A Electra) to complete a world flight that closely mirrored Earhart's flight plan. On the 30th anniversary of her disappearance, Pellegreno dropped a wreath in Earhart's honor over tiny Howland Island and returned to Oakland, completing the  commemorative flight on July 7, 1967.
 In 1997, on the 60th anniversary of Earhart's world flight, San Antonio businesswoman Linda Finch retraced the final flight path flying the same make and model of aircraft as Earhart, a restored 1935 Lockheed Electra 10E. Finch touched down in 18 countries before finishing the trip two and a half months later when she arrived back at Oakland Airport on May 28, 1997.

In 2001, another commemorative flight retraced the route undertaken by Earhart in her August 1928 transcontinental record flight. Dr. Carlene Mendieta flew an original Avro Avian, the same type that was used in 1928.

In 2013, Amelia Rose Earhart (no relation), a pilot and a reporter from Denver, Colorado, announced that she would be recreating the 1937 flight in the middle of 2014 in a single engine Pilatus PC-12NG. She completed the flight without incident on July 11, 2014.

In June and July 2017, Brian Lloyd flew his Mooney M20K 231 around the world to commemorate Earhart's attempted circumnavigation 80 years earlier. Lloyd followed a route similar to the one taken by Earhart.

Other honors 

Countless other tributes and memorials have been made in Amelia Earhart's name, including a 2012 tribute by U.S. Secretary of State Hillary Clinton, speaking at a State Department event celebrating the ties of Earhart and the United States to its Pacific neighbors, noting: "Earhart ... created a legacy that resonates today for anyone, girls and boys, who dreams of the stars." In 2013, Flying magazine ranked Earhart No. 9 on its list of the "51 Heroes of Aviation". The following list is not considered definitive, but serves also to give significant examples of tributes and honors.

 Amelia Earhart Centre And Wildlife Sanctuary was established at the site of her 1932 landing in Northern Ireland, Ballyarnet Country Park, Derry.
 The "Earhart Tree" on Banyan Drive in Hilo, Hawaii, was planted by Earhart in 1935.
 The Zonta International Amelia Earhart Fellowship Awards were established in 1938.

 Earhart Light (also known as the Amelia Earhart Light), a navigational day beacon on Howland Island (has not been maintained and is crumbling).
 The Amelia Earhart Memorial Scholarships (established in 1939 by The Ninety-Nines), provides scholarships to women for advanced pilot certificates and ratings, jet type ratings, college degrees, and technical training.
 The Purdue University Amelia Earhart Scholarship, first awarded in 1940, is based on academic merit and leadership and is open to juniors and seniors enrolled in any school at the West Lafayette campus. After being discontinued in the 1970s, a donor resurrected the award in 1999.
 In 1942, a United States Liberty ship named  was launched. It was wrecked in 1948.
 Amelia Earhart Field (1947), formerly Masters Field and Miami Municipal Airport, after closure in 1959, Amelia Earhart Park was dedicated in an area of undeveloped federal government land located north and west of the former Miami Municipal Airport and immediately south of Opa-locka Airport.
 Amelia Earhart Airport (1958), located in Atchison, Kansas.
 Amelia Earhart Commemorative Stamp (8¢ airmail postage) was issued in 1963 by the United States Postmaster-General.
 The Civil Air Patrol Amelia Earhart Award (since 1964) is awarded to cadets who have completed the first 11 achievements of the cadet program along with receipt of the General Billy Mitchell Award.
 Amelia Earhart Residence Hall opened in 1964 as a residence hall for women at Purdue University and became coed in 2002. An eight-foot sculpture of Earhart, by Ernest Shelton, was placed in front of the Earhart Hall Dining Court in 2009.
 Member of National Aviation Hall of Fame (1968).
 Amelia Earhart Statue by Ernest Shelton (circa 1971), Los Angeles, California
 Member of National Women's Hall of Fame (1973).
 Crittenton Women's Union (Boston) Amelia Earhart Award recognizes a woman who continues Earhart's pioneering spirit and who has significantly contributed to the expansion of opportunities for women (since 1982).
 Earhart Corona, a corona on Venus was named by the IAU in 1982 (initially as Earhart crater).
 The Amelia Earhart Birthplace, Atchison, Kansas (a museum and historic site, owned and maintained by The Ninety-Nines since 1984).
In 1988, the Federal Aviation Administration announced that it had retired Earhart's aircraft registration number, N16020, from use in the United States.
 UCI Irvine Amelia Earhart Award (since 1990).
 She was inducted into the Motorsports Hall of Fame of America in 1992.
 3895 Earhart, a minor planet discovered in 1987, was named in 1995 after her, by its discoverer, Carolyn S. Shoemaker.
 Earhart Foundation, located in Ann Arbor, Michigan. Established in 1995, the foundation funds research and scholarship through a network of 50 "Earhart professors" across the United States.
 Amelia Earhart Festival (annual event since 1996), located in Atchison, Kansas.
 Amelia Earhart Pioneering Achievement Award, Atchison, Kansas: Since 1996, the Cloud L. Cray Foundation provides a $10,000 women's scholarship to the educational institution of the honoree's choice.
 Amelia Earhart Earthwork in Warnock Lake Park, Atchison, Kansas. Stan Herd created the  landscape mural in 1997 from permanent plantings and stone to celebrate the 100th anniversary of Earhart's birth.
 Amelia Earhart Bridge (1997), located in Atchison, Kansas.
 Greater Miami Aviation Association Amelia Earhart Award for outstanding achievement (2006); first recipient: noted flyer Patricia "Patty" Wagstaff.
 On December 6, 2006, California Governor Arnold Schwarzenegger and First Lady Maria Shriver inducted Earhart into the California Hall of Fame located at The California Museum for History, Women and the Arts.
 USNS Amelia Earhart (T-AKE-6) was named in her honor in May 2007.
 Amelia Earhart full size bronze statue was placed at the Spirit of Flight Center located in Lafayette, Colorado, in 2008.

 The Amelia Earhart General Aviation Terminal, a satellite terminal at Boston's Logan Airport (formerly used by American Eagle, now unused).
 Amelia Earhart Dam on the Mystic River in eastern Massachusetts.
 Schools named after Earhart are found throughout the United States including the Amelia Earhart Elementary School, in Alameda, California, Amelia Earhart Elementary School, in Hialeah, Florida, Amelia Earhart Middle School, Riverside, California, and Amelia Earhart International Baccalaureate World School, in Indio, California.
 Amelia Earhart Hotel, located in Wiesbaden, Germany, originally used as a hotel for women, then as temporary military housing is now operated as the U.S. Army Corps of Engineers, Europe District Headquarters with offices for the Army Contracting Agency and the Defense Contract Management Agency.
 Amelia Earhart Road, located in Oklahoma City (headquarters of The Ninety-Nines), Oklahoma.
 Earhart Road, located next to the Oakland International Airport North Field in Oakland, California.
 Amelia Earhart Playhouse, at Wiesbaden Army Airfield.
 To commemorate her first transatlantic flight, on the Millennium Coastal Path at Pwll, Burry Port, South Wales is a blue plaque sponsored by Llanelli Community Heritage.
 In 2015,  was provisionally named after Amelia Earhart.
North Hollywood Amelia Earhart Regional Library and nearby sculpture.
 In 2022, Kansas added a statue of Earhart in the National Statuary Hall Collection.

In popular culture 

Earhart's life has spurred the imaginations of many writers and others; the following examples are given although many other mentions have also occurred in contemporary or current media:
 "Amelia Earhart's Last Flight", by "Yodelling Cowboy" Red River Dave McEnery, is thought to be the first song ever performed on commercial television (at the 1939 World's Fair). He recorded it in 1941 and it was subsequently covered by artists including Kinky Friedman and the Country Gentlemen.
 The Rosalind Russell film Flight for Freedom (1943) derived from a treatment, "Stand by to Die", was a fictionalized treatment of Earhart's life.
 Possibly the first tribute album dedicated to the legend of Earhart was by Plainsong, In Search of Amelia Earhart (Elektra K42120), released in 1972. Both the album and the Press Pak released by Elektra are highly prized by collectors and they have also gained a cult status.
 Singer Joni Mitchell's song "Amelia" appears on her album Hejira (1976) and it also features in the video of her 1980 live album Shadows and Light (1980) with clips of Earhart. Commenting on the origins of the song, which interweaves the story of a desert journey with aspects of Earhart's disappearance, Mitchell said: "I was thinking of Amelia Earhart and addressing it from one solo pilot to another ... sort of reflecting on the cost of being a woman and having something you must do."
 "In Search of: Amelia Earhart", (1976) was episode 16 of the 1976–1982 In Search Of series; this episode spurred a number of popular documentaries that followed.
 A television biographical drama titled Amelia Earhart (1976), starring Susan Clark and John Forsythe, included flying by Hollywood stunt pilot Frank Tallman whose late partner in Tallmantz Aviation, Paul Mantz, had tutored Earhart in the 1930s.

 "Amelia Earhart: The Price of Courage" (1993) is an American Experience television documentary.
 Amelia Earhart: The Final Flight (1994) starring Diane Keaton, Rutger Hauer, and Bruce Dern, was initially released as a TV movie and subsequently rereleased as a theatrical feature.
 In the video game The Simpsons: Hit & Run (2003), Mr. Burns admits to having Amelia Earhart's plane shot down, claiming she was "getting too big for her jodhpurs".
 Actress Amy Adams portrayed Earhart in Night at the Museum: Battle of the Smithsonian (2009).
 In the film Amelia (2009), Earhart is portrayed by Hilary Swank, who also served as co-executive producer of the biopic.
 In 2011, the Great Canadian Theatre Company hosted a musical play titled Amelia: The Girl Who Wants To Fly. This is one of numerous plays on the subject.
 Google honored Earhart with a Doodle on her birthday in 2012.

 Earhart was one of several inspiring women represented by a new line of Barbie dolls introduced March 6, 2018.
 The online battle royale game Fortnite Battle Royale introduces an unlockable costume character named "Airheart", who parodies Earhart.
 In Flying Blind, a "Nathan Heller" novel by Max Allan Collins, Earheart is a major character, a love interest of "Nathan Heller," who was first her bodyguard and who, after her 'disappearance,' seeks to rescue her from her Japanese captors.
 A 2020 digital comic, Wonder Woman: Agent of Peace, had Wonder Woman reveal that a 1930s woman aviator crashed at the Amazons' island Themyscira and chose to remain there permanently. The story doesn't give her name, but was accompanied by a navigator named Fred who didn't survive the crash.
 The Star Trek: Voyager episode "The 37's" solves the mystery of her disappearance via alien abduction.
 Lego produced a limited run of Amelia's "Little Red Bus." Lego Model Number 40450.
 In the 2021 alternate history novella Or Even Eagle Flew by Harry Turtledove, Earhart does not go missing in 1937 and later joins the Eagle Squadrons of the British Royal Air Force to fight against the Nazis in World War II.
 In the Legends of Tomorrow episode "Meat: The Legends", Earhart is revealed to be a lone survivor on an alien planet now possessed by an extraterrestrial.
 In American Horror Story: Double Feature, Earhart (portrayed by Lily Rabe), is found alive by President Dwight Eisenhower and dies giving birth to an alien.

Records and achievements 

 Woman's world altitude record: 14,000 ft (1922)
 First woman to fly the Atlantic Ocean (1928)
 Speed records for 100 km (and with  cargo) (1931)
 First woman to fly an autogyro (1931)
 Altitude record for autogyros: 18,415 ft (1931)
 First woman to cross the United States in an autogyro (1931)
 First woman to fly the Atlantic solo (1932)
 First person to fly the Atlantic twice (1932)
 First woman to receive the Distinguished Flying Cross (1932)
 First woman to fly nonstop, coast-to-coast across the U.S. (1932) 
 Women's speed transcontinental record (1933)
 First person to fly solo between Honolulu, Hawaii, and Oakland, California (1935)
 First person to fly solo from Los Angeles to Mexico City (1935)
 First person to fly solo nonstop from Mexico City to Newark, New Jersey (1935)
 Speed record for east-to-west flight from Oakland, California, to Honolulu, Hawaii (1937)
 First person to fly solo from the Red Sea to Karachi (1937)

Books by Earhart 

Earhart was a successful and heavily promoted writer who served as aviation editor for Cosmopolitan magazine from 1928 to 1930. She wrote magazine articles, newspaper columns, and essays, and published two books based upon her experiences as a flyer during her lifetime:
 20 Hrs., 40 Min. (1928) is a journal of her experiences as the first woman passenger on a transatlantic flight.
 The Fun of It (1932) is a memoir of her flying experiences and an essay on women in aviation.
 Last Flight (1937) features the periodic journal entries she sent back to the United States during her world flight attempt, published in newspapers in the weeks prior to her final departure from New Guinea. Compiled by her husband GP Putnam after she disappeared over the Pacific, many historians consider this book to be only partially Earhart's original work.

See also 

 99s Museum of Women Pilots
 Amelia Earhart Park
 Antoine de Saint-Exupéry
 Aviation archaeology
 Coast Guard Air Station Miami
 Cornelia Fort
 Douglas Corrigan
 Elsie Mackay
 Eugene Luther Vidal
 Frances Wilson Grayson
 Harriet Quimby
 Jerrie Mock
 List of female explorers and travelers
 List of people who disappeared mysteriously at sea
 Nancy Harkness Love

Notes

References

Works cited 

 
 
 
 
 
 
 
 
 
 
 
 
 
 
 
 
 
 
 
 
 
 
 
 
 
 
 
 
 Lubben, Kristen and Erin Barnett. Amelia Earhart: Image and Icon. New York: International Center of Photography, 2007. .
 
 
 Morrissey, Muriel Earhart. Amelia Earhart. Santa Barbara, California: Bellerophon Books, 1992. .
 
 
 
 
 Pellegrino, Anne Holtgren. World Flight: The Amelia Trail. Ames, Iowa: The Iowa State University Press, 1971. .
 
 The Radio Amateur's Handbook. West Hartford, Connecticut: American Radio Relay League, 1945. No ISBN.
 
 
 
 
 Safford, Laurance F. with Cameron A. Warren and Robert R. Payne. Earhart's Flight into Yesterday: The Facts Without the Fiction, McLean, Virginia: Paladwr Press, 2003. .

Further reading 

 Barker, Ralph. Great Mysteries of the Air. London: Pan Books, 1966. .
 Briand, Paul. Daughter of the Sky. New York: Duell, Sloan, Pearce, 1960. 
 Brink, Randall. Lost Star: The Search for Amelia Earhart. New York: W.W. Norton & Company, 1994. .
 Burke, John. Winged Legend: The Story of Amelia Earhart. New York: Ballantine Books, 1971. .
 Cady, Barbara. They Changed the World: 200 Icons Who Have Made a Difference. New York: Black Dog & Leventhal Publishers, 2003. .
 Chapman, Sally Putnam, with Stephanie Mansfield. Whistled Like a Bird: The Untold Story of Dorothy Putnam, George Putnam and Amelia Earhart. New York: Warner Books, 1997. .
 Cochran, Jacqueline and Maryann Bucknum Brinkley. Jackie Cochran: The Autobiography of the Greatest Woman Pilot in Aviation History. Toronto: Bantam Books, 1987. .
 Devine, Thomas E. Eyewitness: The Amelia Earhart Incident. Frederick, Colorado: Renaissance House, 1987. .
 Goodridge, Walt F. Amelia Earhart on Saipan Tour Booklet. Saipan, Marshall Islands: @Walt F. J. Goodridge, 2017. .
 Hoverstein, Paul. "An American Obsession". Air & Space Smithsonian. Vol. 22, No. 2, June/July 2007.
 Landsberg. Alan. In Search of Missing Persons. New York: Bantam Books, 1978. .
 Loomis, Vincent V. Amelia Earhart, the Final Story. New York: Random House, 1985. .
 Moolman, Valerie. Women Aloft (The Epic of Flight series). Alexandria, Virginia: Time-Life Books, 1981. .
 O'Leary, Michael. "The Earhart Discovery: Fact or Fiction?"  Air Classics, Vol 28, No. 8, August 1992.
 Reuther, Ronald T. and William T. Larkins. Images of America: Oakland Aviation. Mount Pleasant, South Carolina: Arcadia Publishing, 2008. .
 Turner, Mary. The Women's Century: A Celebration of Changing Roles 1900–2000. Kew, Richmond, Surrey, UK: The National Archives, 2003. .
 Wright, Monte Duane. Most Probable Position, A History of Aerial Navigation to 1941. Lawrence: University Press of Kansas, 1972. .

External links 

 The Official Website of Amelia Earhart (The Family of Amelia Earhart)
 Amelia Earhart Birthplace Museum
 Papers :
 Records Relating to Amelia Earhart – National Archives
 George Palmer Putnam Collection of Amelia Earhart Papers at Purdue University Libraries
 General Correspondence: Earhart, Amelia, 1932–1934, The Wilbur and Orville Wright

1897 births
1930s missing person cases
1939 deaths
20th-century American women writers
20th-century American writers
Year of death unknown
 
American aviation record holders
American feminists
American people of German descent
Aviation pioneers
Aviators from Kansas
Chevaliers of the Légion d'honneur
Columbia University School of General Studies alumni
Cornell family
Harmon Trophy winners
Hyde Park Academy High School alumni
Missing aviators
National Aviation Hall of Fame inductees
Otis family
People declared dead in absentia
People from Atchison, Kansas
People from Toluca Lake, Los Angeles
People lost at sea
Purdue University faculty
Recipients of the Distinguished Flying Cross (United States)
Victims of aviation accidents or incidents in 1937
Winthrop family
Writers from Kansas
American women aviation record holders
Members of the Society of Woman Geographers
American expatriates in Canada
Women aviation pioneers